The fourteen-lined ctenotus (Ctenotus quattuordecimlineatus)  is a species of skink found in Australia.

References

quattuordecimlineatus
Reptiles described in 1919
Taxa named by Richard Sternfeld